The SŽ series 363 is a class of 3 kV DC electric locomotives operated by Slovenian Railways (SŽ).

They were built in 1975-1977 by the French manufacturer Alsthom. They have a typically Alsthom C′C′ wheel arrangement with monomotor bogies. They share their "Nez Cassé" body design with SNCF Class CC 6500 and NS Class 1600, with their electrical system adapted for the Italian-developed 3 kV DC catenary. Their distinctive French styled bodywork led to them acquiring the nickname "Brižita" ( after the French actress Brigitte Bardot. Most 363 series locomotives bear the standard red and white livery of SŽ, but 363-005 has been repainted back into the original mustard yellow/brown/green colour scheme.

References 

3000 V DC locomotives
Alstom locomotives
Electric locomotives of Slovenia
Standard gauge locomotives of Slovenia
Railway locomotives introduced in 1975
C′C′ locomotives
Standard gauge locomotives of Yugoslavia